Neil Patterson is a Canadian artist and president of the Oil Painters of America (OPA).  Born and raised in Moose Jaw, Saskatchewan, he was educated at the University of Calgary.

In 2000 he became the first Canadian to be awarded Signature status by the OPA. Patterson was elected Master OPA in 2000.  In 2008 he was elected President of the OPA, thereby becoming the first Canadian to hold that position. Patterson's paintings have been exhibited in the United States, Canada and Asia. In March 2007 the National Art Museum of China exhibited Patterson's paintings.

Professional affiliations 
Alberta Society of Artists (ASA)
Federation of Canadian Artists (FCA)
Oil Painters of America (OPA)
Salmagundi Club New York City, New York

Awards 
1988-87 Exhibition of Sunshine Art (ESA) Purchase Award, Sunshine Village, Banff, Alberta
1989 Exhibition of Sunshine Art (ESA) Purchase Award, Sunshine Village, Banff, Alberta
Robert Genn Award, Winter Show FCA, Vancouver, British Columbia
Second Place Award, Fish Creek, Calgary, Alberta
1991 Finalist The Artist's Landscape Competition
2000 Master Signature Member, Oil Painter of America

References

External links
 

Year of birth missing (living people)
Living people
20th-century Canadian painters
Canadian male painters
21st-century Canadian painters
20th-century Canadian male artists
21st-century Canadian male artists